Frank Summers may refer to:
Francis Summers or Frank Summers (1887–1967), English first-class cricketer
Frank Summers (coach) (1899–1974), American football, basketball, and baseball coach
Frank Summers (judge) (1914–1993), Chief Justice of the Louisiana Supreme Court
Frank Summers (Australian footballer) (born 1930), former Australian rules footballer
Frank Summers (American football) (born 1985), American football fullback and special teamer